Barbora Strýcová was the defending champion and successfully defended her title, defeating Viktoriya Kutuzova (0–6, 6–2, 6–2) in the final.

Seeds

Draw

Finals

Top half

Section 1

Section 2

Bottom half

Section 3

Section 4

Sources
Draw

Girls' Singles
Australian Open, 2003 Girls' Singles